Pelhamdale, also known as The Old Stone House of Philip Pell II, is a historic home located in Pelham Manor, Westchester County, New York. It was built about 1750 as a single story dwelling and expanded after 1823.  It is a two-story, five bay, stone residence faced in coursed, rock-faced stone ranging in color from muted orange and red, to gray.  It has white native sandstone Doric order columns on the front porch, lintels and sills, and a plain brick entablature. It features two 2-story bay windows flanking the main entrance. Philip Pell II was a grandson of Thomas Pell (1608–1669).

It was added to the National Register of Historic Places in 1982.

See also
National Register of Historic Places listings in southern Westchester County, New York

References

External links
Historic Pelham: Pelhamdale

Houses on the National Register of Historic Places in New York (state)
Houses completed in 1750
Houses in Westchester County, New York
Pelham, New York
National Register of Historic Places in Westchester County, New York
Pell family